Doddavaram is located in the Maddipadu Mandal of Prakasam District in Andhra Pradesh, India. It is said that this village was known as Veera Narasimha Puri Agraharam during the reign of Addanki rulers.

See also
 Tellapadu

References 

Villages in Prakasam district